Yonghoon Lee (born 22 November 1973) is a South Korean operatic tenor. He has performed at many of the most prestigious theaters in the world, including the Royal Opera House, Covent Garden, Metropolitan Opera, Deutsche Oper Berlin, Vienna State Opera, Rome Opera, Dutch National Opera in Amsterdam, Bavarian State Opera in Munich, Teatro alla Scala in Milan, Semperoper Dresden, Lyric Opera of Chicago, San Francisco Opera, Opera Australia, amongst others.

Biography
Lee studied music at Seoul National University and the Mannes College, The New School for Music. He made his international debut in the title role of Don Carlo at the Teatro Municipal in Santiago, Chile. He made his debut at the Metropolitan Opera in November 2010 in the same role.

He has shared the stage with some of the most renowned sopranos such as Anna Netrebko.

Opera roles

References

External links
 Yonghoon Lee biography at agent's web site
 Yonghoon Lee on OperaBase
 

1973 births
Living people
South Korean opera singers
Academic staff of Seoul National University
Mannes School of Music alumni
Seoul National University alumni
21st-century South Korean male singers
21st-century male opera singers
South Korean tenors